Herbert Manfred "Zeppo" Marx (February 25, 1901 – November 30, 1979) was an American comedic actor,  theatrical agent, and engineer. He was the youngest and last survivor of the five Marx Brothers. He appeared in the first five Marx Brothers feature films, from 1929 to 1933, but then left the act to start his second career as an engineer and theatrical agent.

Early life
Zeppo was born in Manhattan, New York City, on February 25, 1901. His parents were Sam Marx (called "Frenchie" throughout his life), and his wife, Minnie Schönberg Marx. Minnie's brother was Al Shean, who later gained fame as half of the vaudeville team Gallagher and Shean. Marx's family was Jewish. His mother was from East Frisia in Germany and his father was a native of Alsace, France, and worked as a tailor.

Name
As with all of the Marx Brothers, different theories exist as to where Zeppo got his stage name: His older brother Groucho said in his Carnegie Hall concert in 1972 that the name was derived from the Zeppelin airship. Zeppo's ex-wife Barbara Sinatra repeated this in her 2011 book, Lady Blue Eyes: My Life with Frank. His older brother Harpo offered a different account in his 1961 autobiography, Harpo Speaks!, claiming there was a popular trained chimpanzee named Mr. Zippo, and that "Herbie" was tagged with the name because he liked to do chin-ups and acrobatics like the chimp did in its act. The youngest brother objected to being likened to a chimpanzee and it was altered to "Zeppo." In a rare TV interview years later, Zeppo said that Zep is Italian-American slang for baby and as Zeppo was the youngest or baby Marx Brother, he was called Zeppo (BBC Archives).

Career

Early career and The Marx Brothers
Zeppo replaced brother Gummo in the Marx Brothers' stage act when the latter was drafted into the Army in 1918. At that time, Zeppo was employed as a mechanic for the Ford Motor Company. He had no desire for a show business career, but the team's mother, Minnie, insisted he replace Gummo because she wanted to maintain the act as a foursome. Zeppo remained with the team and appeared in their successes in vaudeville, Broadway, and the first five Marx Brothers films as the straight man and romantic lead until 1933. He also made a solo appearance in the Adolphe Menjou comedy A Kiss in the Dark (1925) as Herbert Marx. It was described in newspaper reviews as a minor role though his performance was praised by the New York Sun.

In Lady Blue Eyes, Barbara Sinatra, Zeppo's second wife, reported that Zeppo was considered too young to perform with his brothers, and when Gummo joined the Army, Zeppo was asked to join the act as a last-minute stand-in at a show in Texas. Zeppo was supposed to go out that night with a Jewish friend of his. They were supposed to take out two Irish girls but Zeppo had to cancel to board the train to Texas. His friend went on the date and was shot a few hours later by an Irish gang that disapproved of a Jew dating an Irish girl.

As the youngest and having grown up watching his brothers, Zeppo could fill in for and imitate any of the others when illness kept them from performing. Groucho suffered from appendicitis during a Chicago engagement, and Zeppo filled in for him ably.

"He was so good as Captain Spaulding in Animal Crackers that I would have let him play the part indefinitely, if they had allowed me to smoke in the audience", Groucho recalled. However, a comic persona of his own that could stand up against those of his brothers did not emerge. As critic Percy Hammond wrote, sympathetically, in 1928:

One of the handicaps to the thorough enjoyment of the Marx Brothers in their merry escapades is the plight of poor Zeppo Marx. While Groucho, Harpo, and Chico are hogging the show, as the phrase has it, their brother hides in an insignificant role, peeping out now and then to listen to plaudits in which he has no share.

The popular assumption that Zeppo's character was superfluous was fueled in part by Groucho. According to Groucho's own story, when the group became the Three Marx Brothers, the studio wanted to trim their collective salary, and Groucho replied, "We're twice as funny without Zeppo!"

Zeppo had great mechanical skills and was largely responsible for keeping the Marx family car running. He later owned a company that machined parts for the war effort during World War II, Marman Products Co. of Inglewood, California, later acquired by the Aeroquip Company. This company produced a motorcycle, called the Marman Twin, and the Marman clamps used to hold the "Fat Man" atomic bomb inside the B-29 bomber Bockscar. He obtained patents for a wristwatch that monitored the pulse rate and alarmed if the heartbeat became irregular and a therapeutic pad for delivering moist heat to a patient.

He also founded a large theatrical agency with his brother Gummo. During their time as theatrical agents, Zeppo and Gummo represented numerous screenwriters and actors, including their brothers.

Personal life

Zeppo introduced his cousin Mary Livingstone to Jack Benny during a Passover seder. Livingstone and Benny married in 1926.

On April 12, 1927, Zeppo married Marion Benda (birth name Bimberg). The couple adopted two children, Timothy and Thomas, in 1944 and 1945, and later divorced on May 12, 1954. On September 18, 1959, Marx married Barbara Blakeley, whose son, Bobby Oliver, he wanted to adopt and give his surname, but Bobby's father would not allow it. Bobby simply started using the last name "Marx."

Blakeley wrote in her book, Lady Blue Eyes, that Zeppo never made her convert to Judaism. Blakeley was of Methodist faith and said that Zeppo told her she became Jewish by "injection".

Blakeley also wrote in her book that Zeppo wanted to keep her son out of the picture, adding a room for him onto his estate, which was more of a guest house as it was separated from the main residence. It was also decided that Blakeley's son would go to military school, which according to Blakeley, pleased Zeppo.

Zeppo owned a house on Halper Lake Drive in Rancho Mirage, California, which was built off the fairway of the Tamarisk Country Club. The Tamarisk Club had been set up by the Jewish community, which rivaled the gentile club called The Thunderbird. His neighbor happened to be Frank Sinatra. Along with brothers Groucho and Harpo, Zeppo later attended the Hillcrest Country Club with friends such as Sinatra, George Burns, Jack Benny, Danny Kaye, Sid Caesar, and Milton Berle.

Blakeley became involved with Cedars-Sinai Medical Center and had arranged to show Spartacus (featuring Kirk Douglas) for charity, selling tickets and organizing a post-screening ball. At the last minute, Blakeley was told she could not have the film so Zeppo went to the country club and spoke to Sinatra, who agreed to let him have an early release of a film he had just finished named Come Blow Your Horn. Sinatra also flew everyone involved to Palm Springs for the event.

Sinatra began to invite Blakeley and Zeppo to his house two or three times a week. He would also send champagne or wine to their home, as a friendly gesture. Blakeley and Sinatra began a love affair, unbeknownst to Zeppo. The press eventually got wind of it, snapping photos of Blakeley and Sinatra together or asking her questions whenever she was spotted. Both she and Sinatra denied the affair.

Zeppo and Blakeley divorced in 1973. Zeppo let Blakeley keep a 1969 Jaguar and agreed to pay her $1,500 a month for 10 years. Sinatra upgraded Blakeley's Jaguar to the latest model. Sinatra also gave her a house which had belonged to Eden Hartford, Groucho Marx's third wife. Blakeley and Sinatra continued to date and were constantly hounded by the press until her divorce became final. Blakeley and Sinatra were married in 1976.

Zeppo was accused of beating up 37-year old Jean Bodul, the future wife of mobster Jimmy Fratianno, in 1973; a jury awarded her $20,690 in 1978.

Zeppo became ill with cancer in 1978. He moved to a house on the fairway off Frank Sinatra Drive. The doctors thought the cancer had gone into remission but it returned. An ailing Zeppo turned to Blakeley for support and she accompanied him to doctor's appointments and treatment. Zeppo spent his last days with Blakeley's family.

Death
The last surviving Marx Brother, Zeppo died of lung cancer at the Eisenhower Medical Center in Rancho Mirage on November 30, 1979, at the age of 78. He was cremated and his ashes were scattered into the Pacific Ocean.

In his will, Zeppo left stepson Bobby Marx a few possessions and enough money to finish law school. Both Sinatra and Blakeley attended his funeral.

Legacy
Several critics have challenged the notion that Zeppo did not develop a comic persona in his films. James Agee considered Zeppo "a peerlessly cheesy improvement on the traditional straight man". Along similar lines, Gerald Mast, in his book The Comic Mind: Comedy and Movies, noted that Zeppo's comedic persona, while certainly more subtle than his brothers', was undeniably present:

[He] added a fourth dimension as the cliché of the [romantic] juvenile, the bland wooden espouser of sentiments that seem to exist only in the world of the sound stage. ... [He is] too schleppy, too nasal, and too wooden to be taken seriously.

While this interpretation of Zeppo's comedic contributions could seemingly be considered a contemporary reappraisal of his role in the Paramount pictures, more astute film reviewers were apparently in on the joke as far back as the release of I'll Say She Is, the team's 1924 Broadway hit. In its review of the play, The New York Daily News called Zeppo "the obliging audience of the family – the feeder who helps his brothers be funny by playing straight himself". When The New York Times reviewed their debut film The Cocoanuts in 1929, it ranked all four Marx Brothers equally – "When the four Marx brothers are on the screen, it's a riot" [emphasis added] – and went on to describe each of the brothers' unique style of comedy, and praised Zeppo as "the handsome but dogged straight man with the charisma of an enamel washstand".

In his essay "The Marx Brothers: From Vaudeville to Hollywood," Roger S. Bader observes that the films that the Marx Brothers made as a trio after Zeppo left the group should generally be considered a different comedy team altogether, noting that "changes in the Marx Brothers’ screen personas [were] immediate and apparent," with less of vaudevillian-inspired anarchy and more in tune with standard Hollywood comedies where "love stories [were] injected in the plots [to] make their films more palatable to female moviegoers". Bader notes Zeppo's absence as a symptom of his older brothers' watered-down new act:

Their zaniness and anarchy would be heavily diluted at M-G-M as the studio found them a wider audience. … These are not vaudeville’s Marx Brothers. But in the Paramount films they certainly are the Marx Brothers of the stage – the FOUR Marx Brothers, as Minnie intended them to be. While Zeppo may not be as busy as his brothers, they function best as a quartet. Groucho may have had other capable straight men, but when Zeppo takes a letter to the honorable Charles H. Hoongerdoonger, Marx Brothers fans know he’s the best man for the job. … Those five films are one of the last links to the era when vaudeville was the primary form of entertainment in America – and the Four Marx Brothers were packing vaudeville theaters across the country. Of course they were still great as a trio in their later films, but if you want to know what it was like to see them on stage, you need to start with four of them – and their first five films.

In her book Hello, I Must be Going: Groucho & His Friends, Charlotte Chandler defended Zeppo as being "the Marx Brothers' interpreter in the worlds they invaded. He was neither totally a straight man nor totally a comedian, but combined elements of both, as did Margaret Dumont. Zeppo's importance to the Marx Brothers' initial success was as a Marx Brother who could 'pass' as a normal person. None of Zeppo's replacements (Allan Jones, Kenny Baker and others) could assume this character as convincingly as Zeppo, because they were actors, and Zeppo was the real thing, cast to type" (562). Chandler's appraisal of Zeppo's role in the films – as an interpreter for his older brothers to the audience – was essentially confirmed by Groucho himself, who once noted that Zeppo's role was "handsome, obtuse, slightly wooden," and that he "brought logic to a basically illogical story," acting as "an intrusion" to their otherwise complete anarchy.

Zeppo's comic persona was further highlighted in the "dictation scene" of Animal Crackers. In his book Groucho, Harpo, Chico, and Sometimes Zeppo, Joe Adamson analyzed the scene, showing how it revealed Zeppo's ability to one-up Groucho with simple, plain-English rebuttals. In the scene, Groucho dictates a letter to his lawyer, which Zeppo takes down. Adamson noted,

There is a common assumption that Zeppo = Zero, which this scene does its best to contradict. Groucho dictating a letter to anybody else would hardly be cause for rejoicing. We have to believe that someone will be there to accept all his absurdities and even respond somewhat in kind before things can progress free from conflict into this genial mishmash. Groucho clears his throat in the midst of his dictation, and Zeppo asks him if he wants that in the letter. Groucho says, 'No, put it in the envelope.' Zeppo nods. And only Zeppo could even try such a thing as taking down the heading and the salutation and leaving out the letter because it didn't sound important to him. It takes a Marx Brother to pull something like that on a Marx Brother and get away with it.

In the same book, Adamson noted Zeppo's position as the campy parody of the juvenile romantic in his analysis of Horse Feathers. This tongue-in-cheek observation bolstered the theory of Zeppo's stiffness as a deliberate comic persona:

Each Marx Brother has his own form of comedy. Zeppo is at his funniest when he opens his mouth and sings. It has taken forty years, of course, for the full humor to come across. For a normal comedian this may be bad timing, but for a Marx Brother it's immortality. Almost every crooner of 1932 looks stilted and awkward now, but with Zeppo, who was never very convincing in the first place, the effect crosses the threshold into lovable comedy. "I think you're wonderful!" he oozes charmingly to Thelma Todd, and we know he never met her before shooting started.

Critic Danél Griffin, who praises Zeppo as "that great comic parody of the schleppy juvenile role of the 1920s/30s musicals", believes that the onscreen dynamic between Groucho and Zeppo is one of the "key relationships between the individual Marx Brothers [that] shape their comedic strategy, not counting when the four of them are onstage together." Griffin points out that Zeppo is often the brother who puts ideas into Groucho's head that set up storylines and big laughs; he goes on to explain,

Zeppo’s onscreen relationship with Groucho has always been tricky to ascertain; Zeppo is generally Groucho's aloof secretary in their films, but he is seemingly capable of reducing Groucho to stunned silence with simple, plain-English rebuttals (see Animal Crackers) when Chico's snappy comebacks only fuel Groucho’s insults all the more. … Zeppo's parts are usually small, but he performs exactly what is required of him as an outwardly wooden fellow who is incapable of being rattled by a man whose business is to rattle.

Allen W. Ellis wrote in his article "Yes, Sir: The Legacy of Zeppo Marx":

Indeed, Zeppo is a link between the audience and Groucho, Harpo and Chico. In a sense, he is us on the screen. He knows who those guys are and what they are capable of. As he ambles out of a scene, perhaps it is to watch them do their business, to come back in as necessary to move the film along, and again to join in the celebration of the finish. Further, Zeppo is crucial to the absurdity of the Paramount films. The humor is in his incongruity. Typically he dresses like a normal person, in stark contrast to Groucho's greasepaint and 'formal' attire, Harpo's rags, and Chico's immigrant hand-me-downs. By most accounts, he is the handsomest of the brothers, yet that handsomeness is distorted by his familial resemblance to the others – sure, he's handsome, but it is a decidedly peculiar, Marxian handsomeness. By making the group four, Zeppo adds symmetry, and in the surrealistic worlds of the Paramount films, this symmetry upsets rather than confirms balance: it is chaos born of symmetry. That he is a plank in a maelstrom, along with the very concept of 'this guy' who is there for no real reason, who joins in and is accepted by these other three wildmen while the narrative offers no explanation, are wonderful in their pure absurdity. 'To string things together in a seemingly purposeless way,' said Mark Twain, 'and to be seemingly unaware that they are absurd, is the mark of American humor.' The 'sense' injected into the nonsense only compounds the nonsense.

In a eulogy for Zeppo written in 1979 for The Washington Post, columnist Tom Zito wrote:

Thank goodness for Zeppo, who never really cracked a joke on screen. At least not directly. He just took it from Groucho, in more ways than one. ... If Groucho, Chico and Harpo were the funny guys, Zeppo was the Everyman, the loser who'd come running out of the grocery store only to find the meter maid sticking the parking ticket on his Hungadunga.

Zeppo's performances produced this tribute from a prominent fan, written in Marc Eliot's 2005 biography of Cary Grant. Grant, a teenager performing in vaudeville under his real name, Archie Leach, loved the Marx Brothers. And as Eliot put it,

While the rest of the country preferred Groucho, Zeppo, the good-looking straight man and romantic lead, was Archie's favorite, the one whose foil timing he believed was the real key to the act's success. Not long after, Archie began to augment his already well-practiced "suave" Fairbanks look and dress with a Zeppo-like fancy bowtie (called a jazz-bow, or jazzbo, during the Roaring Twenties) and copied his brilliantine hairstyle, adding Dixie Peach, a favorite pomade of American black performers and show business leads, by the palmful to his thick dark mop, to give it a molded, comb-streaked blue-black Zeppo sheen.

In his book The Anarchy of the Imagination: Interviews, Essays, Notes, noted filmmaker Rainer Werner Fassbinder included Zeppo on his list for the ten greatest film actors of all time.

In a June 2016 review of an Off-Broadway revival of I'll Say She Is, The New Yorkers Adam Gopnik wrote:

Matt [Walters], becoming Zeppo, is a reminder that the Marxes were never quite as good again after they lost their one straight man. The object of the Marxes' comedy is anarchy, but its subject is fraternity: they are in it together to the end. Zeppo's inclusion in the family made the others less like clowns and more like brothers.

Awards and honors
In the 1974 Academy Awards telecast, Jack Lemmon presented Groucho with an honorary Academy Award to a standing ovation. The award was also on behalf of Harpo, Chico, and Zeppo, whom Lemmon mentioned by name. It was one of Groucho's final major public appearances. "I wish that Harpo and Chico could be here to share with me this great honor," he said, naming the two deceased brothers (Zeppo was still alive at the time and in the audience). Groucho also praised the late Margaret Dumont as a great straight woman who never understood any of his jokes.

In popular culture
On the television series Cheers, Lilith Crane said Zeppo was her favorite Marx brother.

A third-season episode of the television series Buffy the Vampire Slayer was titled "The Zeppo". This episode focuses on the perspective of the character Xander Harris; his position as ostensibly the least impressive or capable member of the cast is compared to Zeppo Marx.

The Mystery Science Theater 3000 character TV's Frank revealed in episode 323 featuring Sax Rohmer's The Castle of Fu Manchu, that while he was working at Arby's, he was given the nickname of "Zeppo" due to his supposed sense of humor.

Filmography

Film

References

External links
 
 
 
 The Marx Brothers Council Podcast episode devoted to Zeppo
 

1901 births
1979 deaths
Male actors from Palm Springs, California
American male comedians
American male comedy actors
American male film actors
American male musical theatre actors
American male stage actors
American inventors
American people of German-Jewish descent
Jewish American male actors
Deaths from lung cancer in California
Male actors from New York City
Vaudeville performers
Marx Brothers
20th-century American male actors
Jewish American comedians
20th-century American comedians
20th-century American male singers
20th-century American singers